Nageshwari is an upazila of Kurigram District in the Division of Rangpur, Bangladesh located at .

As of the 1991 Bangladesh census, Nageshwari has a population of 279775. Males constitute are 50.72% of the population, and females 49.28%. This Upazila's eighteen up population is 131990. Nageshwari has an average literacy rate of 19.4% (7+ years), and the national average of 32.4% literate.

Administration
Nageshwari Thana, formed in 1793, was turned into an upazila on 15 April 1983.

The upazila is divided into Nageshwari Municipality and 14 union parishads: Bamondanga, Berubari, Bhitorbond, Bollobherkhas, Hasnabad, Kachakata, Kaligonj, Kedar, Narayanpur, Newyashi, Noonkhawa, Raigonj, Ramkhana, and Sontaspur. The union parishads are subdivided into 79 mauzas and 350 villages.

Nageshwari Municipality is subdivided into 9 wards and 81 mahallas.

See also
Upazilas of Bangladesh
Districts of Bangladesh
Divisions of Bangladesh

References

Upazilas of Kurigram District